Sergei Nikolayevich Vasyutin (born July 2, 1957) is a Russian professional football coach.

Vasyutin managed FC Zarya Leninsk-Kuznetsky in the Russian First Division.

External links
Profile at Footballfacts.ru

1957 births
Living people
Russian football managers